William Ellis Porter II (born September 21, 1969) is an American actor, singer, writer, and director. He graduated from Carnegie Mellon University School of Drama, and he achieved fame performing on Broadway before starting a solo career as a singer and actor.

Porter won the 2013 Tony Award for Best Actor in a Musical for his role as Lola in Kinky Boots. He credits the part for "cracking open" his feminine side to confront toxic masculinity. For the role, Porter also won the Drama Desk Award for Outstanding Actor in a Musical and Outer Critics Circle Award for Outstanding Actor in a Musical. In 2014 Porter won the Grammy Award for Best Musical Theater Album for Kinky Boots. Porter starred in all three seasons of the television series Pose, for which he was nominated for three Golden Globe Awards and won the 2019 Primetime Emmy Award for Outstanding Lead Actor in a Drama Series, becoming the first gay black man to be nominated and win in any lead acting category at the Primetime Emmys. In 2020, he was included on Times list of the 100 most influential people in the world. In 2022, he won another Tony Award, for Best Musical as a producer for the musical A Strange Loop. He made his directorial debut in 2022 with the romantic comedy film Anything's Possible.

Early life 
Porter was born in Pittsburgh, Pennsylvania, to William Ellis Porter and Cloerinda Jean Johnson Porter Ford. His sister is Mary Martha E. Ford. He grew up in a "very religious" Pentecostal family and has described being sexually abused by his stepfather between the ages of 7 and 12.

He attended Reizenstein Middle School, before graduating from Allderdice High School and Pittsburgh Creative and Performing Arts School in 1987. He graduated from the College of Fine Arts at Carnegie Mellon University with a Bachelor of Fine Arts in Drama and earned a certification from the graduate-level Professional Program in Screenwriting at UCLA.

During the summers of 1985 through 1987, Porter was a member of entertainment groups "Spirit" and "Flash", which performed daily at Kennywood, a Pittsburgh-area amusement park.

Career 
Porter appeared on American Talent Show Star Search in 1992 and won $100,000. He appeared on the same show as other future stars, such as a young Britney Spears.

Porter played Teen Angel in the 1994 Broadway revival of Grease. Other shows he has been in include Topdog/Underdog at City Theatre (2004), Jesus Christ Superstar and Dreamgirls at Pittsburgh Civic Light Opera (2004), and the song cycles Myths and Hymns and Songs for a New World (Off-Broadway, 1995).

Porter wrote and performed in his one-person autobiographical show, Ghetto Superstar (The Man That I Am) at Joe's Pub in New York City in February and March 2005. He was nominated for "Outstanding New York Theater: Broadway & Off Broadway Award" at the 17th GLAAD Media Awards.

In September 2010, Porter appeared as Belize in Signature Theatre Company's 20th Anniversary production of Tony Kushner's Angels in America.

Porter originated the role of "Lola" in Kinky Boots on Broadway in 2013, with songs by Cyndi Lauper, book by Harvey Fierstein and directed/choreographed by Jerry Mitchell. Porter won both the 2013 Drama Desk Award for Outstanding Actor in a Musical and Tony Award for Best Actor in a Musical for this role.

Porter has also appeared in many films. He played a major role as Shiniqua, a drag queen who befriends Angel (David Norona) and Lee (Keivyn McNeill Graves) in Seth Michael Donsky's Twisted (1997), an adaptation of Oliver Twist. He has also appeared on The RuPaul Show.

He has had a musical career with three solo albums released, Billy Porter on DV8/A&M Records in 1997, At the Corner of Broadway + Soul in 2005 on Sh-K-Boom Records and Billy's Back on Broadway (Concord Music Group) in 2014. He featured in a number of songs in the tribute album; It's Only Life: The Songs of John Bucchino in 2006 released on PS Classics. He sings on Adam Guettel's 1999 album Myths and Hymns studio cast album on Nonesuch Records. He also covered "Only One Road" that was included on the Human Rights Campaign compilation album Love Rocks.

Porter wrote the play While I Yet Live, which premiered Off-Broadway at Primary Stages in September 2014 in previews, officially on October 12. In addition to Porter, the cast included Lillias White and S. Epatha Merkerson.

Porter released Billy Porter Presents the Soul of Richard Rodgers in April 2017. The album, which features new, soulful takes on classic Richard Rodgers songs, includes solos and duets from the following artists (in addition to Porter himself): Tony and Grammy Award winners Cynthia Erivo (The Color Purple), Renée Elise Goldsberry (Hamilton) and Leslie Odom Jr. (Hamilton), Tony Award-winner Patina Miller (Pippin), Grammy Award winners Pentatonix, India Arie and Ledisi, Tony Award nominees Brandon Victor Dixon (Shuffle Along), Joshua Henry (Violet), and Christopher Jackson (Hamilton), alongside YouTube and Kinky Boots star Todrick Hall and multiple Grammy Award nominee Deborah Cox.

Porter reprised the role of Lola in Kinky Boots in September 2017 on Broadway, where he did a 15-week run.

In 2018, Porter starred in the FX show Pose in the role of Pray Tell. In 2019, Pose earned its renewal for a third season after airing just one episode from the second season. In August 2018, Porter confirmed via Instagram that he was joining the cast of American Horror Story for its eighth season, subtitled Apocalypse. Porter duetted with Pose co-star Dyllón Burnside and sang from his album in a benefit concert emceed by Burnside on July 23, 2018, to celebrate the season 1 finale and to raise money for GLSEN. In June 2019, to mark the 50th anniversary of the Stonewall riots, sparking the start of the modern LGBTQ rights movement, Queerty named him one of the Pride50 "trailblazing individuals who actively ensure society remains moving towards equality, acceptance, and dignity for all queer people". Also in June 2019 he presented the Excellence in Theatre Education Award at the 73rd Tonys at Radio City Music Hall. However, he earned media coverage for his haute couture red and pink gown, upcycled from Kinky Boots' stage curtains, in a uterine shape, and his impromptu performance of "Everything's Coming up Roses" from Gypsy, for host James Corden's "Broadway karaoke". In September 2019, he was nominated for a Golden Globe Award and won the Primetime Emmy Award for Outstanding Lead Actor in a Drama Series for Pose, becoming the first openly gay black man to be nominated and win in any lead acting category at the Primetime Emmys.

Also, in 2019, Porter had a cameo appearance in Taylor Swift's "You Need to Calm Down" music video that featured twenty LGBTQ icons.

Porter performed "For What It's Worth" with Stephen Stills during the 2020 Democratic National Convention.

His memoir, Unprotected, was released in 2021.

Fashion

Porter attributes his love of fashion from an early age to growing up in the black church which he describes as "a fashion show". His style has gone through many phases over the years, including vintage, Abercrombie and Fitch and geek chic. He has said that he intentionally set out to use fashion in a political way, to be a "walking piece of political art". Porter's stylist Sam Ratelle estimated that as of January 2020 they had worked on 150 red carpet looks together many designed by Porter himself. , Porter's stylist is Ty Hunter who has previously worked with Beyoncé.

At the 2019 Golden Globes, Porter gained attention for wearing an embroidered suit and pink cape designed by Randi Rahm. He said the fact that people were surprised that he wore a cape inspired him to ask Christian Siriano if he could create him a ball gown because it was something he had always wanted to wear. He felt it seemed like a way to challenge people's ideas of masculinity. He continued to make fashion waves that year when he wore a fitted tuxedo jacket and a velvet gown by Christian Siriano with 6" Rick Owens boots to the 91st Academy Awards.

In February 2019, Porter was an Official Council of Fashion Designers of America (CFDA) Ambassador for New York Fashion Week: Mens. Porter attended the 2019 Met Gala and embraced the Camp: Notes on Fashion theme by being carried on a litter by six shirtless men while sporting a "Sun God" ensemble. The Blonds designed Porter's outfit, and it included a bejeweled catsuit outfitted with  wings, a 24-karat gold headpiece, as well as custom gold-leaf Giuseppe Zanotti shoes and fine jewels by Andreoli, John Hardy, and Oscar Heyman.

In 2020, Porter wore a floor-length pink poncho style gown with a wide brimmed black hat, a look he characterized as "Handmaid's Tale realness", to the AFI Awards and to the Golden Globes he wore an all-white ensemble that included a tuxedo jacket with a feathered train. He wore a sparkling turquoise bodysuit with matching bolero and a motorised hat to the Grammy awards.

Concerts
Porter has performed at various venues in New York City, including Lincoln Center, which was broadcast on PBS in 2015 and Joe's Pub in New York City. In 2019 Porter headlined at London Pride.

Porter performed "For What It's Worth" with Stephen Stills at the 2020 Democratic National Convention.

Personal life
Porter is gay, having come out at the age of 16, "in the middle of the AIDS crisis". He married his husband, Adam Smith, on January 14, 2017, after meeting him in 2009. He was very keen to get married "while Obama was still president and before January 20th, 2017" so the two got engaged on December 29, 2016, and married 2 weeks later.

Porter shared his views on race in the US in a 2020 interview with Vanity Fair, saying, "The reason why our country is in the mess we're in is simply because of whiteness. White supremacy. White people choke-holding power and sucking the life out of humanity."

In May 2021, Porter told The Hollywood Reporter that he had been diagnosed with HIV in June 2007; he was also diagnosed with type-2 diabetes in February 2007 and filed for bankruptcy in March 2007. In the same interview, he talked about renting a house on Long Island during the COVID-19 pandemic due to a pre-existing health condition and about having intermittently attended psychotherapy since the age of 25.

Discography

Albums
1997: Billy Porter (DV8/A&M Records)
2005: At the Corner of Broadway + Soul (Sh-K-Boom Records)
2014: Billy's Back on Broadway (Concord Music Group)
2017: Billy Porter Presents the Soul of Richard Rodgers (Masterworks Broadway)

Singles
1997: "Show Me"/"What Iz Time"
2005: "Awaiting You"/"Time" (Live) (Sh-K-Boom Records)
2017: "Edelweiss"
2019: "Love Yourself"
2020: "For What It's Worth" 
2020: The Shapeshifters feat. Billy Porter "Finally Ready" 
2021: "Children"

Other songs
"Only One Road" on Love Rocks compilation album
"Love Is on the Way" on The First Wives Club album
"Destiny" with Jordan Hill on Jim Brickman's Greatest Hits album
"Where Is Love?" with Liz Callaway

Appears in
Featured on a number of songs on tribute album It's Only Life: The Songs of John Bucchino
Sings “O Holy Night” on Rosie O'Donnell’s Christmas album, A Rosie Christmas (1999)
Adam Guettel's album Myths and Hymns in 1999
He is featured with Alan Cumming, David Raleigh and Ari Gold in a cover of "That's What Friends Are For", of 'The Friends Project' in support of the Ali Forney Center, a NYC shelter for homeless LGBT youth. The song was arranged and produced by Nathan Leigh Jones and directed by Michael Akers.

Filmography

Film

Television

Theater
Sources: Playbill Vault; Off-Broadway Database

Miss Saigon, Ensemble/John (u/s), Broadway (1991)
Grease, Teen Angel, Broadway (1994)
The Merchant of Venice, Solanio, Off-Broadway (1995)
Songs for a New World, performer, Off-Broadway (1995)
Smokey Joe's Cafe, performer, Broadway (1995–97)
Miss Saigon, John (replacement), Broadway (1998–99)
Jesus Christ Superstar, Jesus of Nazareth, Helen Hayes Performing Arts Center, Nyack, NY (1998)
Dreamgirls, James Thunder Early, New York Actors Fund concert (September 2001)
Radiant Baby, Various, Off-Broadway (2003)
Topdog/Underdog, City Theatre, Pittsburgh, PA (2004)
Little Shop of Horrors, Audrey ll (replacement), Broadway (2004)
Chef's Theater: A Musical Feast, Performer, Off-Broadway (2004)
Ghetto Superstar, Performer, Off-Broadway (2005) – also playwright
Birdie Blue, Bam/Little Pimp/Sook/Minerva, Off-Broadway (2005)
Putting It Together, performer, New York (2009)
Angels in America, Belize, Off-Broadway (2010)
Kinky Boots, Lola, Broadway (2013–2015)
Kinky Boots, Lola (replacement), Tour (2014)
HAM: A Musical Memoir, Off-Broadway (2015) – director
Shuffle Along, or the Making of the Musical Sensation of 1921 and All That Followed, Aubrey Lyles, Broadway (2016)
White Rabbit Red Rabbit, Off-Broadway (2016)
Kinky Boots, Lola (replacement), Broadway (2017)

Awards and nominations

See also
 LGBT culture in New York City
 List of LGBT people from New York City

References

External links

 
 
 
Billy Porter on LastFM

1969 births
Living people
African-American male actors
African-American Christians
American male musical theatre actors
American male stage actors
American male television actors
American male voice actors
American gay actors
American gay musicians
LGBT people from Pennsylvania
LGBT African Americans
LGBT Christians
Male actors from Pittsburgh
Musicians from Pittsburgh
Carnegie Mellon University College of Fine Arts alumni
Taylor Allderdice High School alumni
20th-century American male actors
20th-century American singers
21st-century American male actors
21st-century American singers
Drama Desk Award winners
Grammy Award winners
Outstanding Performance by a Lead Actor in a Drama Series Primetime Emmy Award winners
Tony Award winners
Pennsylvania Democrats
People with HIV/AIDS
20th-century American male singers
21st-century American male singers
20th-century American LGBT people
21st-century American LGBT people
African-American male singers
LGBT film directors
African-American film directors